The Civic Decoration is a civilian decoration of the Kingdom of Belgium.  It was first established by royal decree on 21 July 1867 to reward exceptional acts of bravery, devotion or humanity.  A further royal decree of 15 January 1885 extended the award to state civil servants for long service by a mere change of ribbon.  The award statute was once again amended by royal decree in 1902 to include long service in the Civic Guard and firefighters, each with its distinctive ribbon.

Two wartime variants were created to reward civilians who distinguished themselves during the World Wars.  The Civic Decoration 1914–1915 (later dated 1918) was created on 18 May 1915 to reward civilians and non-combatants who served their country with distinction during World War I.  A similar Decoration was also established for World War II on 21 July 1944 by the Belgian government in exile.

The Civic Decoration, previously solely awarded by Royal Decree, has been awarded directly by regions and communities since the 1993 federalisation of Belgium.

Award statute

Classes
The Civic Decoration is awarded in two categories:
 The Civic Cross (further subdivided into a First and a Second Class);
 The Civic Medal (further subdivided into a First, Second and Third Class).
These classes are common to all the types of the Civic Decoration.

Award criteria
The Civic Decoration for long and distinguished service in the administration and firefighters is awarded:
 Civic Cross: for 35 years of meritorious service, with the First Class going to employees of higher rank;
 Civic Medal: for 25 years of meritorious service, with the First Class going to employees of higher rank.

The Civic Medal Third Class (bronze), which was principally intended for award to indigenous personnel in the colonies, is no longer awarded.

The Decoration for exceptional acts of bravery, devotion or humanity is awarded on a case-by-case basis. The Civic Cross First Class for exceptional acts of bravery, devotion or humanity is only awarded posthumously.

Award description
The badge of the Civic Cross is a white enamelled maltese cross with the central medallion bearing the monogram of King Leopold I or of King Albert I (for the 1914–1918 Cross) on the obverse and reverse. Between the arms of the Cross are:
 Crossed swords for the Civic Cross 1914–1918
 Crossed flaming torches for the Civic Cross 1940–1945;
 A Burgundy Cross for the Civic Cross for administrative services and for services as a firefighter.
The cross 1st class is gilt, the second class is silver.

The Medal is vaguely octagonal and looks like a closed florian cross, it bears the relief image of the Civic Cross.  The medal for 1914–1918 is topped with crossed swords, the medal for 1940–1945 is topped with crossed flaming torches.  The medal first class is gold, the second class is silver and the third class is bronze.

The ribbons of the Civic Decoration and Medal differ with the type of award:
 The ribbon is red with three vertical black stripes when the award is for long and distinguished service in the administration;
 The ribbon is red with two vertical black stripes bordered on each side by a yellow line when the award is for exceptional acts of bravery, devotion or humanity;
 The ribbon is green with two vertical white stripes when the award is for long and distinguished service as a firefighter;
 The ribbon is pale green with vertical black, yellow and red stripes on each edge (black towards the center) and a central vertical gold stripe for the 1914–1918 award;
 The ribbon is saffron with vertical black, yellow and red stripes on each edge (red towards the center) and a central vertical black stripe for the 1940–1945 award.
The ribbons of the war time awards are adorned with a metal clasp bearing 1914–1918 or 1940–1945.

Notable recipients (partial lists)

Civic Cross 1st class

Count Beaudoin de Lichtervelde*Baron Albert Houtard
Count Edmond Carton de Wiart
Count Louis Cornet d’Elzius de Ways Ruart
Baron Émile de Cartier de Marchienne
Viscount Jacques Davignon
August de Schryver
Ambassador Jacques Delvaux de Fenffe
Vicount Gaston Eyskens
Camille Huysmans
Edmond Leburton
Baron Albert Lilar
Hendrik Marck
Baron Charles Papeians de Morchoven
Louis Roppe
Count Jean-Charles Snoy et d’Oppuers
Paul van den Boeynants
Baron Joseph van der Elst
Alfons Vranckx

Civic Cross 2nd class
Civic Guard Colonel Baron Auguste Goffinet
Civic Guard Colonel Baron Constant Goffinet
Baron Paul Kronacker
Michel Lévie
Sir Donald Stewart, 1st Baronet

Civic Medal 1st class
Jozef De Saeger
Baron Raoul du Sart de Bouland
Albert Lavens
Anthony Sadler
Spencer Stone
Geraard van den Daele
Baron François-Xavier van der Straden Waillet

1914–1918 Civic Cross 1st class
Paul Charles
Gérard Cooreman
Count Charles de Broqueville
Cardinal Désiré Mercier
Viscount Georges Terlinden

1914–1918 Civic Cross 2nd class
Count Arnold t’Kint de Roodenbeke

1940–1945 Civic Cross 1st class
Baron Albert Houtard
Baron Charles Poswick
Baron Pierre van Outryve d’Ydewalle

See also
 List of Orders, Decorations and Medals of the Kingdom of Belgium

References

Other sources
 Quinot H., 1950, Recueil illustré des décorations belges et congolaises, 4e Edition. (Hasselt)
 Cornet R., 1982, Recueil des dispositions légales et réglementaires régissant les ordres nationaux belges. 2e Ed. N.pl.,  (Brussels)
 Borné A.C., 1985, Distinctions honorifiques de la Belgique, 1830–1985 (Brussels)

External links
 The Civic Decoration at Mauquoy Medal Company , one of the last manufacturers of the decoration
 The Civic Decoration 1914–1918 at Northeast Medals
 History and pictures of the Civic Decoration 1914–1918
 Information about Belgium orders Website BONNE & VERBEKE (in Dutch)
ARS MORIENDI Notables from Belgian history (In French and Dutch)

Civil awards and decorations of Belgium
Awards established in 1867
Awards established in 1915
Awards established in 1944
1867 establishments in Belgium